The ESWE Verkehrsgesellschaft (German for ESWE Transport Company) or ESWE Verkehr is a municipally owned company responsible for operating public transport in Wiesbaden, Germany. It operates 40 bus-lines and 9 night bus-lines

The company is a member of the Rhein-Main-Verkehrsverbund (RMV).

External links
ESWE web site (German language)
ESWE web site (English language subset)

Transport in Wiesbaden
Companies based in Wiesbaden
Transport companies of Germany